Unión Quilpué are a Chilean football club based in the city of Quilpué. The club was founded February 14, 2002 and plays in Tercera división.

Football clubs in Chile
Association football clubs established in 2002
2002 establishments in Chile